Ronald Whitney is an American politician who served in the Massachusetts House of Representatives from 1995 to 1997. He was elected to the House in 1995 in a special election to succeed Michael Sullivan, who was appointed Plymouth County District Attorney. He was defeated in his bid for a full term by Kathleen Teahan.

References

Living people
Members of the Massachusetts House of Representatives
Year of birth missing (living people)